Caspar Bartholin the Elder (12 February 1585 – 13 July 1629) was a Danish physician, scientist and theologian.

Biography
Caspar Berthelsen Bartholin was born at Malmø, Denmark (modern Sweden). His precocity was extraordinary; at three years of age he was able to read, and in his thirteenth year he composed Greek and Latin orations and delivered them in public. When he was about eighteen he went to the University of Copenhagen and afterwards studied at Rostock and Wittenberg.

He then travelled through Germany, the Netherlands, England, France and Italy, and was received with marked respect at the different universities he visited. In 1613 he was chosen professor of medicine in the University of Copenhagen and filled that office for eleven years, when, falling into a dangerous illness, he made a vow that if he should recover he would apply himself solely to the study of divinity.
He later taught theology at the university and was a canon of Roskilde.

His work, Anatomicae Institutiones Corporis Humani (1611) was for many years a standard textbook on the subject of anatomy.  He was the first to describe the workings of the olfactory nerve.

Personal life
He was married to Anna Fincke, daughter of the mathematician Thomas Fincke.
Of his sons, Bertel Bartholin (1614–1690), Thomas Bartholin (1616–1680) and Rasmus Bartholin (1625–1698) were also noted scholars.
His grandson Caspar Bartholin the Younger (1655–1738) was a noted anatomist. 
He died on 13 July 1629 at Sorø in Zealand.

Works 

Anatomicae Institutiones Corporis Humani (1611)

References

Other sources
 

1585 births
1629 deaths
Danish scientists
17th-century Danish physicians
17th-century Danish scientists
Danish Protestant theologians
Danish anatomists
History of anatomy
Medical educators
People from Malmö
Textbook writers
University of Copenhagen alumni
Academic staff of the University of Copenhagen
University of Rostock alumni
17th-century Protestant theologians
Rectors of the University of Copenhagen
Bartholin family